KFRG (95.1 FM) is a commercial radio station licensed to San Bernardino, California, and broadcasting to the Riverside-San Bernardino-Inland Empire radio market.  KFRG airs a country music radio format calling itself "K-FROG" and is believed to be the original "Frog" station under previous owner Keymarket.  The brand name has been subsequently licensed by Keymarket to dozens of American radio stations.  

Owned by Audacy, Inc., its studios are in Colton and the transmitter site off Cloudland Truck Trail north of San Bernardino.  KFRG broadcasts an HD Radio signal.  Programming is also heard on KXFG Menifee at 92.9 MHz and on the HD-2 digital subchannel of KCBS-FM Los Angeles 93.1 MHz.

History

Christian Radio and Soft AC
The station signed on in August 1974 as KQLH.  It had a Christian radio format and was owned by Channel Six Thirty Two, Inc.  At first, its signal was limited, powered at 15,000 watts, less than a third of its current output.  

In the early 1980s, KQLH was acquired by Keymarket Stations, which flipped the format to soft adult contemporary.  It also carried news updates from the Mutual Broadcasting System.  Due to strong competition from Los Angeles stations 103.5 KOST and 104.3 KBIG, also Soft AC stations, KQLH struggled in the ratings.

Country Music K-FROG
On December 25, 1989, Christmas Day, KQLH flipped to a country music format. The call letters were changed to KFRG to go along with its new nickname "K-FROG."  Country music proved popular in the Inland Empire and K-FROG saw a big improvement in its ratings.  In 1998, KFRG was acquired by the Infinity Broadcasting Corporation, which was later merged into CBS Radio.

On August 17, 2006, KFRG became the only country music station that could be heard in the Los Angeles area by default.  LA's country station, KZLA, changed its programming format to rhythmic adult contemporary, leaving the nation's #2 market without a spot on the FM dial airing country music.  

As a result of the void left by KZLA, KFRG briefly began showing up in the Los Angeles ratings.  The station began focusing more on Orange County and Los Angeles area news and traffic.  But on February 23, 2007, KKGO-FM 105.1 flipped from classical music to country, putting that format back on a full-powered Los Angeles FM station.

In 2009, KFRG and its simulcast stations joined the Motor Racing Network for coverage of NASCAR races, but left after the 2013 season.

On October 15, 2015, KFRG was named "Station of the Year" by the Inland Empire chapter of the American Advertising Federation.

Current On Air Staff
The on-air lineup at K-Frog currently includes local personalities-

 The Wake Up Call with David Bugenske and Kelli Green weekdays 5am-9am
 Country Radio Hall of Famer Heather Froglear weekdays 9am-12pm 
 Anthony Donatelli afternoons 3pm-7pm
 Dana Swearingen weekends 3pm-7pm
 Vicki Pepper weekends 10am-3pm

National programming includes- 

 Katie Neal Afternoons 12pm-3pm 
 Rob and Holly Evenings 7pm-12am
 Coop's Rockin' Country Saturday Night 7pm-12am
 Josh "Bru" Brubaker on Sunday evenings 7pm-12am. 
 Heather Froglear host of "90's Country" Sunday 8am-10am.
 Rob and Holly host Audacy's Top 20 Countdown on Saturday 8am-10am

Entercom and Audacy
On February 2, 2017, CBS Radio announced it would merge with Entercom. The merger was approved on November 9, 2017, and was consummated on the 17th.  

In 2021, Entercom changed its name to Audacy, Inc.  KFRG can be streamed on the Audacy app and website.

Simulcasts
KFRG is simulcast on KXFG 92.9 MHz in Menifee, which serves the Temecula area of Southern California.  The station is also heard on the HD-2 digital subchannel of co-owned 93.1 KCBS-FM Los Angeles.

Until February 16, 2010, KVFG (103.1 FM) in Victorville also carried KFRG's programming.  It switched to a sports format that day, then to a classic hits format on December 26, 2011. KVFG has since been sold to El Dorado Broadcasters and in October 2019 it flipped to a Regional Mexican format, branded as "La X 103.1."

References

External links
 
 

FROG
Audacy, Inc. radio stations
Country radio stations in the United States
Mass media in Riverside, California
Mass media in San Bernardino, California
Mass media in Riverside County, California
Mass media in San Bernardino County, California
Radio stations established in 1974
1974 establishments in California